She's a Machine! is the third studio album by Swedish electronic band Alice in Videoland, released in Sweden on 20 April 2008 by National Records. German pressings of the album include a bonus disc titled A Different Perspective, which contains reworked versions of the songs on the original disc.  The North American CD release includes a cover of the  Guano Apes song "Open Your Eyes", as well as a single edit of "We Are Rebels" in which Maja Ivarsson's guest vocals have been removed and are instead sung by Toril Lindqvist.

Track listing
"She's a Machine" – 2:46
"Mf" – 3:56
"Numb" – 4:14
"We Are Rebels" (featuring Maja Ivarsson of The Sounds) – 3:40
"Who's That Boy" – 3:44
"Candy" – 3:01
"Weird Desire" – 2:44
"Tomorrow" – 2:54

North American bonus tracks
"Open Your Eyes" – 3:35
"Numb" (Single Edit) – 3:54
"We Are Rebels" (Single Edit) – 3:38

German bonus disc – A Different Perspective
"Candy" – 3:03
"She's a Machine" – 3:19
"Mf" – 3:59
"Tomorrow" – 5:09
"Weird Desire" – 2:08
"Open Your Eyes" – 3:25
"Numb" – 4:31
"Who's That Boy" – 4:00

Release history

Use in other media
The track "We Are Rebels" is used in the Anthill Films mountain biking documentary Follow Me.

References

2008 albums
Alice in Videoland albums